Izúcar de Matamoros is a city in Izúcar de Matamoros Municipality located in the southwestern part of the Mexican state of Puebla.  The city serves as the municipal seat of the municipality. At the census of 2005 the city had a population of 41,042 inhabitants, while the municipality had a population of 69,413. The municipality has an area of 514.11 km² (198.5 sq mi), and stands at 1100 m above sea level. Its largest other communities are the towns of La Galarza and San Juan Raboso. It has many sights like the portales, and Santo Domingo, the biggest church in the city.

History
Izúcar de Matamoros derives its name from the Náhuatl word Itzocan, which is composed from itztli, meaning "knife" or "flint," ohtli meaning "path," and -can. Therefore, it means "place of the flint path." Other interpretations suggest that it could mean "place of painted faces," or "place of obsidian" or "place where obsidian is worked."

Izúcar de Matamoros was the site of the Mexican American War Skirmish at Matamoros on 23 November 1847.

Agriculture
The agriculture of the surrounding countryside is devoted to growing sugar cane which is processed at a plant in Atencingo.

Notable People

Alfonso Castillo Orta (1944-2009), potter
Ángel Maturino Reséndiz (1959-2006), serial killer

Paulina Ana María Zapata Portillo (1915-2010), suffragist

References
Link to tables of population data from Census of 2005 INEGI: Instituto Nacional de Estadística, Geografía e Informática
Puebla Enciclopedia de los Municipios de México

External links
Gobierno Municipal de Izúcar de Matamoros Official website
www.IzucardeMatamoros.info Pictures, videos, news and chat of Izucar de Matamoros

Populated places in Puebla